The 1997 season was the Minnesota Vikings' 37th in the National Football League (NFL) and their sixth under head coach Dennis Green. The team finished with a 9–7 record and qualified for a wild card berth in the playoffs. In the wild card round against the New York Giants, the Vikings came back from a 22–13 deficit with 90 seconds to play to win 23–22, their first playoff victory since 1988. In the divisional round, the Vikings were defeated 38–22 by the San Francisco 49ers.

Vikings defensive tackle John Randle led the league in sacks with 15.5.  Wide receiver Cris Carter's 13 touchdown receptions also were most in the league.

Before the season, the Vikings acquired Randall Cunningham after a year out of the game, a move that reunited Cunningham with his former Philadelphia Eagles teammate Cris Carter.

Offseason

1997 Draft

Undrafted free agents

Preseason

Regular season

Schedule

Note: Intra-division opponents are in bold text.

Standings

Postseason

Statistics

Team leaders

League rankings

Staff

Roster

References

Minnesota Vikings seasons
Minnesota
Minnesota